The 1992 WDF Europe Cup was the 8th edition of the WDF Europe Cup darts tournament, organised by the World Darts Federation. It was held in Kerava, Finland from 21 to 24 October.



Entered teams

16 countries/associations entered a men's selection in the event.

15 countries/associations entered a woman's selection in the event.

Men's singles

Men's Pairs

Men's team
Round Robin 

Group A

 England 9 - 0  Norway
 England 9 - 3  Ireland
 Norway 9 - 8  Ireland

Group B

 Northern Ireland 9 - 6  Scotland
 Northern Ireland 9 - 3  Germany
 Denmark 9 - 7  Northern Ireland
 Denmark 9 - 7  Scotland
 Scotland 9 - 4  Germany
 Germany 9 - 6  Denmark 

Group C

 Finland 9 - 6  Belgium
 Finland 9 - 5  Sweden
 Finland 9 - 5  Switzerland
 Belgium 9 - 5  Sweden 
 Belgium 9 - 4  Switzerland
 Sweden 9 - 5  Switzerland

Group D

 Wales 9 - 8  Netherlands
 Wales 9 - 0  Italy 
 Wales 9 - 3  France 
 Netherlands 9 - 1  Italy 
 Netherlands 9 - 5  France 
 Italy 9 - 6  France

Knock Out

Woman's singles

Woman's Pairs
Round Robin 

Group A

 Sharon Colclough & Sue Edwards 4 - 2  Nuala Coney & Rhonda Henry
 Sharon Colclough & Sue Edwards 4 - 0  Anne Kerneis & Laurence Le Bris
 Nuala Coney & Rhonda Henry 4 - 1  Anne Kerneis & Laurence Le Bris

Group B

 Gerda Søgaard-Weltz & Lene Mikkelsen 4 - 3  Joan Flynn & Breda Doyle
 Gerda Søgaard-Weltz & Lene Mikkelsen 4 - 3  Sirpa Levanen & Paivi Jussila
 Gerda Søgaard-Weltz & Lene Mikkelsen 4 - 0  Astrid Kamm & Heike Ernst
 Joan Flynn & Breda Doyle 4 - 1  Astrid Kamm & Heike Ernst
 Sirpa Levanen & Paivi Jussila 4 - 2  Joan Flynn & Breda Doyle
 Astrid Kamm & Heike Ernst 4 - 2  Sirpa Levanen & Paivi Jussila

Group C

 Rhian Speed & Sandra Greatbatch 4 - 2  Karin Nordahl & Kristel Olsen
 Rhian Speed & Sandra Greatbatch 4 - 0  Jessica Larsson & Ewa Kristiansson    
 Cathie Gibson-McCulloch & Janette Youngson 4 - 3  Rhian Speed & Sandra Greatbatch
 Cathie Gibson-McCulloch & Janette Youngson 4 - 0  Jessica Larsson & Ewa Kristiansson
 Karin Nordahl & Kristel Olsen 4 - 3  Cathie Gibson-McCulloch & Janette Youngson
 Karin Nordahl & Kristel Olsen 4 - 1  Jessica Larsson & Ewa Kristiansson

Group D

 Francis Hoenselaar & Kitty van der Vliet 4 - 1  Sabine Beutler & Amparo Barbera 
 Francis Hoenselaar & Kitty van der Vliet 4 - 0  Maria Vercnocke & Vicky Pruim
 Francis Hoenselaar & Kitty van der Vliet 4 - 1  Maria-Grazia Maran & Cinzia Borgia
 Sabine Beutler & Amparo Barbera 4 - 3  Maria Vercnocke & Vicky Pruim 
 Sabine Beutler & Amparo Barbera 4 - 1  Maria-Grazia Maran & Cinzia Borgia   
 Maria Vercnocke & Vicky Pruim 4 - 0  Maria-Grazia Maran & Cinzia Borgia 

Knock Out

References

Darts tournaments